FC Sète won Division 1 season 1933/1934 of the French Association Football League with 34 points.

Participating teams

 FC Antibes
 AS Cannes
 SC Fives
 Olympique Lillois
 Olympique de Marseille
 SO Montpellier
 OGC Nice
 SC Nîmes
 CA Paris
 RC Paris
 Stade Rennais UC
 Excelsior AC Roubaix
 FC Sète
 FC Sochaux-Montbéliard

Final table

Promoted from Division 2, who will play in Division 1 season 1934/1935:
 Olympique Alès
 FC Mulhouse
 Red Star Olympique
 RC Strasbourg

Results

Top goalscorers

References
 Division 1 season 1933-1934 at pari-et-gagne.com

Ligue 1 seasons
France
1